Carbacanthographis aptrootii is a species of corticolous (bark-dwelling) lichen in the family Graphidaceae. Found in Yunnan, China, it was formally described as a new species in 2022 by Shirley Cunha Feuerstein and Robert Lücking. It is only known to occur at the type locality. It has a greyish to yellowish grey thallus that lacks both a cortex and a prothallus. It contains norstictic acid, a lichen product that can be detected using thin-layer chromatography. The collector of the type, Dutch lichenologist André Aptroot, is honoured in the specific epithet "for his numerous, important contributions to tropical lichenology".

References

aptrootii
Lichen species
Lichens described in 2022
Taxa named by Robert Lücking
Lichens of China